Nostalgia, Piano Stories III (or Piano Stories III briefly) is an album by Japanese composer Joe Hisaishi originally released on October 14, 1998, in Japan. It is the third of his collection "Piano Stories" where he gathers his successes in the Japanese cinematographic industry through his partnership with Hayao Miyazaki but also original compositions.

Track listing 
All songs were written by Joe Hisaishi, except "Taiyou ga Ippai," which is a rendition of Nino Rota's score to "Purple Noon",  and "Babylon no Oka", which is a rendition of French composer Camille Saint-Saëns' opera "Samson and Delilah."

References 
 Nostalgia Piano Stories III, MusicBrainz

1998 albums